"Desert Night" is a song by Australian alternative dance group Rüfüs. The song was released on 21 June 2013 as the second single from the group's debut studio album, Atlas (2013). The song peaked at number 67 in June 2013.

Reception
Your EDM said "Desert Nights" "...layers wistful vocals over a combination of supple pads, horns, and percussive instruments to create an emotional blend of genres."
Ivan Zuniga from Ear Milk said  "The original mix of "Desert Night" has a smooth danceable beat mixed with a catchy indie tempo that flows well with the soft vocals."

Music video
The music video was directed by Katzki and released on 20 June 2013.

Track listing

Charts

Certifications

Release history

References

2013 songs
2013 singles
Rüfüs Du Sol songs